The Moldova women's national basketball team represents Moldova in international women's basketball. They are controlled by the Basketball Federation of Moldova.

Competitive record

EuroBasket & Championship for Small Countries

See also
Moldova women's national under-18 basketball team
Moldova women's national under-16 basketball team
Moldova men's national basketball team

References

External links
Official website
Moldova at FIBA site
Moldova National Team – Women at Eurobasket.com
Moldova Basketball Records at FIBA Archive

Basketball in Moldova
Women's national basketball teams
Basketball